Conway Marsh railway station (later known as Conway Morfa) was located about a mile north west of Conwy, Wales (Conway being the English name for the town).

History
The station opened as Conway Marsh (but did not appear in the timetables) on 12 May 1894 by the London and North Western Railway on its Chester and Holyhead route to serve an Army training camp and rifle range on the marsh to the north of the line.

The station was relocated on 2 May 1901 and renamed Conway Morfa. The station was situated on a loop of the north side of the line, there was a siding and a signal box.

The station ceased to be used in 1929,  and has since been demolished.

Despite being closed the station site was used for 18 LMS caravans in 1937 and 1938 followed by 30 caravans in 1939.

References

Bibliography

External links

Former London and North Western Railway stations
Railway stations in Great Britain opened in 1895
Railway stations closed in 1929